Get Some Friends is an album by hip-hop artist Ghettosocks, released in 2006.

The album reached #1 on the Chart Attack and !earshot album charts.

Critical reception
Exclaim! wrote that Ghettosocks "hits a variety of production styles and he knits them all together with great attention to atmospheric sounds and little details within the beats." The Coast called the album "pure ear candy, throwing the calendar back to the days of hip-hop’s infancy, when word of mouth was more important than the hype or history of beef that the genre finds itself mired in today."

Track listing

References

2006 albums